Michele Gabellone (also spelled Cabalone, Caballone, Cabelone, Cabellone, Gabbalone) (November 1692, in Naples – 19 January 1740, in Naples) was an Italian composer best known for his operas.

Operas
La Cantarina (3 Acts, commedia per musica, libretto by A. Piscopo, Carnival 1728, Naples, Teatro dei Fiorentini)
La Ciulla o puro Chi fa freuma arriva a tutto (commedia per musica, libretto by Carlo De Palma), Spring 1728, Naples, Teatro dei Fiorentini) 
La fenta schiava, chelleta pe mmuseca (1728, Naples, Teatro dei Fiorentini) 
Ammore vò speranza (commedia per musica, libretto by De Palma, Carnival 1729, Naples, Teatro dei Fiorentini) 
Adone re di Cipro (dramma per musica, libretto by Filippo Vanstryp, Carnival 1731, Rome, Teatro Capranica) 
Li dispiette amoruse (commedia per musica, libretto by Antonio Palomba, Autumn 1731, Naples, Teatro Nuovo)

References

1692 births
1740 deaths
Italian classical composers
Italian male classical composers
Italian opera composers
Male opera composers